Ibritumomab tiuxetan (pronounced ), sold under the trade name Zevalin, is a monoclonal antibody radioimmunotherapy treatment for non-Hodgkin's lymphoma. The drug uses the monoclonal mouse IgG1 antibody ibritumomab in conjunction with the chelator tiuxetan, to which a radioactive isotope (either yttrium-90 or indium-111) is added. Tiuxetan is a modified version of DTPA whose carbon backbone contains an isothiocyanatobenzyl and a methyl group.

Medical use
Ibritumomab is used to treat relapsed or refractory, low grade or transformed B cell non-Hodgkin's lymphoma (NHL), a lymphoproliferative disorder, and previously untreated follicular NHL in adult patients who achieve a partial or complete response to first-line chemotherapy. The treatment should not be administered to patients with ≥25% lymphoma marrow involvement and/or impaired bone marrow reserve.

The treatment starts with an infusions of rituximab. This may be followed by an administration of indium-111 labelled ibritumomab tiuxetan (111In replaces the 90Y component) to allow the distribution of the drug to be imaged on a gamma camera, before the actual therapy is administered. Seven to nine days later, a second infusion of rituximab is given, followed by the 90Y-ibritumomab tiuxetan, by intravenous infusion over around 10 minutes. The radioactive activity is determined based on patient body weight and platelet count.

Mechanism of action
The antibody binds to the CD20 antigen found on the surface of normal and malignant B cells (but not B cell precursors), allowing radiation from the attached isotope (mostly beta emission) to kill it and some nearby cells. In addition, the antibody itself may trigger cell death via antibody-dependent cell-mediated cytotoxicity (ADCC), complement-dependent cytotoxicity (CDC), and apoptosis. Together, these actions eliminate B cells from the body, allowing a new population of healthy B cells to develop from lymphoid stem cells.

History
Developed by the IDEC Pharmaceuticals, now part of Biogen Idec, ibritumomab tiuxetan was the first radioimmunotherapy drug approved by the Food and Drug Administration (FDA) in 2002 to treat cancer. It was approved for the treatment of patients with relapsed or refractory, low‑grade or follicular B‑cell non‑Hodgkin's lymphoma (NHL), including patients with rituximab refractory follicular NHL. It was given marketing authorisation by the European Medicines Agency in 2004 for the treatment of adult patients with rituximab relapsed or refractory CD20+ follicular B-cell non-Hodgkin's lymphoma.

In September 2009, ibritumomab received approval from the FDA for an expanded label to include previously untreated patients with a chemotherapy response.

Availability
Ibritumomab is currently under patent protection and not available in generic form. When first approved, it was the most expensive drug available given in a single dose, costing over US$37,000 (€30,000) for the average dose. However, ibritumomab is essentially an entire course of lymphoma therapy which is delivered in 7–9 days, with one visit for pre-dosing Rituxan, and one visit a week later for the actual Zevalin therapeutic dose preceded by Rituxan.  Compared to other monoclonal antibody treatments (many of which are well over US$40,000 for a course of therapy), it may be considered cost effective.

See also 
 Tositumomab, an alternative radioimmunotherapy treatment for non-Hodgkin's lymphoma.

External links 
Official Zevalin site

References 

Monoclonal antibodies for tumors
Antibody-drug conjugates
Yttrium compounds
Indium compounds
Radiopharmaceuticals